The Kotzschmar Memorial Organ, usually referred to as the Kotzschmar Organ, is a pipe organ located at Merrill Auditorium in the City Hall of Portland, Maine, United States.

History 

Built in 1911 by the Austin Organ Co. as Opus 323, the Kotzschmar Organ was the second-largest organ in the world at the time, and it remains the largest organ in Maine today.

The organ was donated to the city by Portland native Cyrus Hermann Kotzschmar Curtis, founder of the Curtis Publishing Company of Philadelphia, as a memorial to Hermann Kotzschmar, a close family friend for whom he had been named.  Kotzschmar was a German-born musician who came to Portland in 1849, acquired a reputation as the city's most prominent musician, and lived there until his death in 1908.

The Kotzschmar Organ is a prime example of the U.S. style of municipal (city–owned) organs which were once a prevalent part of American culture throughout the first half of the 20th century. It was the first municipal organ built in the U.S., and is one of only two U.S. municipal organs still owned by a municipality – the other being the Spreckels Organ in San Diego, California.

Organists

Municipal organists
The City of Portland created the position of Municipal Organist in 1912. The position was maintained until 1981 when it was eliminated due to budget constraints. That same year a non-profit organization called Friends of the Kotzschmar Organ was formed in order to provide continued funding for a municipal organist (who would become an FOKO employee), as well as to fund maintenance and restoration of the organ.

To date, there have been eleven municipal organists in Portland:
 Will C. Macfarlane, 1912–1919
 Irvin John [James] Morgan, 1919–1921
 Edwin H. Lemare, 1921–1923
 Charles Raymond Cronham, 1924–1932
 Alfred Brinkler, 1935–1952
 John E. Fay, 1952–1976
 Douglas Rafter, 1976–1981
 Gerald McGee, 1983–1988
 Earl Miller, 1988–1989
 Ray Cornils, 1990–2017
 James Kennerley, 2018–present

Visiting organists
A partial list of notable organists who have played the Kotzschmar Memorial Organ:

 E. Power Biggs
 Joseph Bonnet
 Cameron Carpenter
 Ken Cowan
 Virgil Fox

 Felix Hell
 Thomas Heywood
 Dennis James
 Olivier Latry
 Ben van Oosten

 John Scott
 Frederick Swann
 Gillian Weir
 Carol Williams
 Berj Zamkochian

External links 

 Friends of the Kotzschmar Organ
 Official City of Portland site for the Merrill Auditorium

References 

Individual pipe organs
Culture of Portland, Maine
Tourist attractions in Portland, Maine